The eleventh edition of the South American Championship was held in Lima, Peru from 30 October to 27 November 1927. The participating countries were Argentina, Bolivia, Peru, and Uruguay. Brazil, Chile and Paraguay withdrew from the tournament. This was the first South American Championship in which Peru participated. The tournament was also used as a qualifier for the 1928 Summer Olympics and both Argentina and Uruguay were subsequently invited to enter that competition.

The Argentina team departed from Retiro railway station to Chilean city Valparaíso, where they joined Uruguayan players to board a ship to the port of Callao, Lima. They arrived in Peru after eight days of trip.

Squads
For a complete list of participants squads see: 1927 South American Championship squads

Venues

Final round
Each team played a single match against each of the other teams. Two points were awarded for a win, one point for a draw and zero points for a defeat.

Result

Goal scorers
3 goals

  Alfredo Carricaberry
  Segundo Luna
  Roberto Figueroa
  Pedro Petrone
  Héctor Scarone

2 goals

  Manuel Ferreira
  Juan Maglio
  Humberto Recanattini
  Manuel Seoane
  José Bustamante
  Héctor Castro
  Antonio Sacco

1 goal

  Mario Alborta
  Alberto Montellanos
  Demetrio Neyra
  Jorge Sarmiento
  Alejandro Villanueva
  Juan Arremón

Own goals

  Santiago Ulloa (for Uruguay)
  Canavesi (for Argentina)

References

 
1927
1927
Football qualification for the Summer Olympics
1927 in South American football
South
1927 in Argentine football
1927 in Uruguayan football
1927 in Bolivia
Football at the 1928 Summer Olympics
October 1927 sports events
November 1927 sports events
Sports competitions in Lima
1920s in Lima